The Latécoère 13 was a French airliner designed by Lignes Aériennes Latécoère in the early 1920s.

Design
The Latecoere 13 was twin-engine airliner.

Specifications

References

1920s French airliners
12
Aircraft first flown in 1922
Twin-engined piston aircraft